Aiken Colored Cemetery, a historic cemetery in Aiken, South Carolina, US, covers nearly 10 acres and is located several miles from the downtown area. It was the only burial grounds for Aiken's African-American community through the mid 20th century.

The cemetery began operating in 1852, well before the Civil War era. Its occupants represent a diverse range including slaves, freedmen, business leaders, tradesmen, and paupers. The cemetery is now called Pine Lawn Memorial Gardens and is accessible to the public.

Aiken Colored Cemetery was listed in the National Historic Register on March 19, 2007.

References

External links
 

African-American history of South Carolina
Cemeteries on the National Register of Historic Places in South Carolina
1852 establishments in South Carolina
Buildings and structures in Aiken, South Carolina
Tourist attractions in Aiken County, South Carolina
National Register of Historic Places in Aiken County, South Carolina
African-American cemeteries